The 1860 United States presidential election in Oregon took place on November 6, 1860, as part of the 1860 United States presidential election. Oregon voters chose three representatives, or electors, to the Electoral College, who voted for president and vice president.

Oregon voted in its first ever presidential election, having become the 33rd state on February 14, 1859. The state was won by Illinois Representative Abraham Lincoln (R–Kentucky), running with Senator Hannibal Hamlin, with 36.20% of the popular vote, against the 14th Vice President of the United States John C. Breckinridge (SD–Kentucky), running with Senator Joseph Lane, with 34.37% of the popular vote and Senator Stephen A. Douglas (D–Illinois), running with 41st Governor of Georgia Herschel V. Johnson, with 27.99% of the popular vote.

Oregon was the only state where the first and second place finishers matched the first and second place national finishers in the electoral college (Lincoln first, then Breckenridge in second).

Results

See also
 United States presidential elections in Oregon

References

Oregon
1860
1860 Oregon elections